The Maly Volkhovets is a right (eastern) armlet of the Volkhov in Novgorodsky District of Novgorod Oblast in Russia. The Vishera, one of the Volkhov's principal tributaries, is a tributary of the Maly Volkhovets.

The name of the armlet, which means "The Minor Volkhov", originates from the name of the Volkhov River.

The village of Volotovo with the Assumption Church in Volotovo is located on the right bank of Maly Volkhovets.

References

External links

Rivers of Novgorod Oblast
0Maly Volkhovets